The 1981–82 Drake Bulldogs women's basketball team represented Drake University during the 2015–16 NCAA Division I women's basketball season. The Bulldogs were led by eighth year head coach Carole Baumgarten. They played their home games at Veterans Memorial Auditorium and were members of the Missouri Valley Conference. They finished the season 28–7, 7–0 in MVC play.

Schedule

|-
!colspan=9 style="background:#004477; color:#FFFFFF;"| Regular season

|-
!colspan=9 style="background:#004477; color:#FFFFFF;"| NCAA Tournament

References

Drake Bulldogs women's basketball seasons